This topic covers notable events and articles related to 2019 in music.

Specific locations

African music
American music
Asian music
Australian music
Brazilian music
British music
Canadian music
Chinese music
Czech music
Danish music
European music
Finnish music
French music
German music
Icelandic music
Indian music
Indonesian music
Irish music
Japanese music
Latin music
Malaysian music
Monogolian music
Norwegian music
Philippine music
Polynesian music
Scandinavian music
South Korean music
Swedish music
Taiwanese music 
Vietnamese music

Specific genres

Classical
Country
Electronic
Jazz
Latin
Heavy metal
Hip hop
Rock
Pop

Albums released

Awards

Bands formed

 1Team
 1the9
 3YE
 AB6IX
 ALI
 ALLMO$T
 Ariaz
 Argon
 Argonavis from BanG Dream!
 Ballistik Boyz from Exile Tribe
 BDC
 B.O.L.T
 Better Oblivion Community Center
 Beyooooonds
 Bis
 Bvndit
 Carry Loose
 CGM48
 Cherry Bullet
 CIX
 College Cosmos
 D1CE
 DEL48
 Dialogue
 Dos Monos
 DracoVirgo
 Dry Cleaning
 ENOi
 Everglow
 EXO-SC
 Fanatics
 Girls²
 The Highwomen
 Hinatazaka46
 Hinapia
 Honest Boyz
 Horsegirl
 Household Gods
 Itzy
 Jus2
 King Gnu
 Mameshiba no Taigun
 Newkidd
 Oneus
 Onewe
 OnlyOneOf
 Purplebeck
 Purple Mountains
 Real Like You
 Rocket Punch
 Rolling Quartz
 Sard Underground
 SB19
 Simple Creatures
 Static Dress
 Sunday Service
 SuperM
 Teen Teen
 TXT
 Verivery
 WayV
 We in the Zone
 Wet Leg
 Wooseok x Kuanlin
 Tebasaki Sensation
 Tomorrow X Together
 X1
 Yoasobi
 ZOC

Soloist debuts

 Akari Kitō
 Baby Keem
 Bae Jin-young
 Baekhyun
 Benee
 Camilo
 Chen
 Chen Zhuoxuan
 Chih Siou
 Davina Michelle
 Dove Cameron
 Eito
 Elaine
 Emilia Mernes
 Griff
 Ian Chan
 Haruka Fukuhara
 Ha Sung-woon
 Hwasa
 Im Hyun-sik
 Jang Dong-woo
 Jeon Somi
 Jung Dae-hyun
 Joyce Pring
 Kang Daniel
 Kang Min-kyung
 KD Estrada
 Keung To
 Kim Jin-woo
 Kim Ji-yeon
 Kim Jung-mo
 Kim Woo-sung
 Kwon Hyun-bin
 Lee Jin-hyuk
 Lee Jin-young
 Lee Min-hyuk
 Mayu Maeshima
 Milet
 Nichkhun
 Nicki Nicole
 Oh Ha-young
 Park Ji-hoon
 Roh Tae-hyun
 Ruann
 Sayaka Yamamoto
 Shen Yue
 Sulli
 Sungmin
 Tate McRae
 U-Know
 U-Kwon
 Vaundy
 Yoon Ji-sung
 Yoona
 Yukika
 Yuuri
 Zelo
 Zephanie

Bands reformed

 Alphabeat
 Bauhaus
 Bikini Kill
 The Black Crowes
 Egypt Central
 Heart
 Idiot Pilot
 Jawbox
 Jonas Brothers
 McFly
 Men at Work 
 Motion City Soundtrack
 My Chemical Romance
 Oysterhead
 Rage Against the Machine
 The Rapture
 Rockpile
 Roxy Music (one performance)
 Stereolab
 Stereos
 Strange Advance
 Supergrass
 The Pussycat Dolls
 Vex Red
 Vivian Girls

Bands on hiatus

 An Cafe
 Blu-Billion
 DNCE
 Devin Townsend Project
 Fifth Harmony
 fun.
 f(x)
 Hedley
 Katatonia
 Linkin Park
 Moose Blood
 One Direction
 Shinee

Bands disbanded

 Alpine
 The Apocalypse Blues Revue
 Boyzone
 Cassius
 The Cranberries
 Country Girls
 Delorean
 Divinyls
 Fischerspooner
 Flower
 Free Cake for Every Creature
 Her's
 Hobbs' Angel of Death
 Hollerado
 The Hoopers
 Janne Da Arc
 Kalafina
 Kinoko Teikoku
 Little Green Cars
 The Muffs
 The Pains of Being Pure at Heart
 Negoto
 Nine Muses
 Pentagon
 Prophets of Rage
 Purple Mountains
 Rah Rah
 Rock a Japonica
 Roxette
 The Searchers
 Serebro
 Slayer
 Spandau Ballet
 Superjoint
 Thursday
 Tsuri Bit
 Toto
 Yeasayer
 Wake Up, Girls!

Deaths

January
 1
 Shane Bisnett, 31, American metalcore bassist (Ice Nine Kills)
 Feis Ecktuh, 32, Dutch rapper
 Joan Guinjoan, 87, Spanish composer and pianist
 Kris Kelmi, 63, Russian rock singer and keyboardist
 Pegi Young, 66, American folk rock singer-songwriter and guitarist
 2 – Daryl Dragon, 76, American pop keyboardist and songwriter (Captain & Tennille, The Beach Boys)
 3 – Steve Ripley, 69, American country rock singer-songwriter and guitarist (The Tractors)
 5
 Alvin Fielder, 83, American jazz drummer
 Eric Haydock, 75, British rock bassist (The Hollies)
 Dan Tshanda, 54, South African pop singer and bassist (Splash)
 7
 Jimmy Hannan, 84, Australian pop singer
 John Joubert, 91, British classical music composer
 Clydie King, 75, American pop and rock singer
 Houari Manar, 38, Algerian rai singer
 9 – Joseph Jarman, 81, American jazz saxophonist (Art Ensemble of Chicago)
 10
 Larry Cunningham, 67, American R&B singer (The Floaters)
 Kevin Fret, 24, Puerto Rican trap singer
 12 – Sanger D. Shafer, 84, American country singer-songwriter
 13
 Glen Dale, 79, English pop singer (The Fortunes)
 Bonnie Guitar, 95, American country singer
 Willie Murphy, 75, American blues singer and pianist
 David "Frenchy" O'Brien, 71, American drummer (Animotion)
 15 – Carol Channing, 97, American Broadway and film musicals singer
 16
 Lorna Doom, 61, American punk rock bassist (Germs)
 Brian Velasco, 41, Filipino hard rock drummer (Razorback)
 Chris Wilson, 62, Australian blues singer and guitarist
 17 
 Debi Martini, American punk rock singer and bassist (Red Aunts)
 Ron Watson, 62, Canadian rock guitarist (Helix)
 Reggie Young, 82, American rock guitarist (The Memphis Boys)
 19 – Ted McKenna, 68, Scottish glam rock drummer (The Sensational Alex Harvey Band)
 21
 Marcel Azzola, 91, French chanson accordionist
 Kaye Ballard, 93, American pop singer
 Edwin Birdsong, 77, American funk keyboardist
 Maxine Brown, 87, American country singer (The Browns)
 23 – Oliver Mtukudzi, 66, Zimbabwean afro-jazz guitarist
 25 
 Bruce Corbitt, 56, American thrash metal singer (Rigor Mortis, Warbeast)
 Jacqueline Steiner, 94, American folk singer-songwriter
 26 
 Jean Guillou, 88, French composer and classical organist
 Michel Legrand, 86, French composer, conductor and jazz pianist
 27 – Pepe Smith, 71, Filipino rock singer and guitarist (Juan de la Cruz Band, Speed, Glue & Shinki, Asin)
 28 – Paul Whaley, 72, American psychedelic rock drummer (Blue Cheer, The Oxford Circle)
 29 – James Ingram, 66, American R&B singer-songwriter
 31 – Harold Bradley, 93, American country guitarist

February
 1 
 Alex Brown, 52, American punk rock guitarist (Gorilla Biscuits, Project X)
 Ayub Ogada, 63, Kenyan worldbeat singer and Nyatiti player
 2 – Tim Landers, American emo guitarist and singer (Transit, Misser)
 3 
 Detsl, 35, Russian rapper
 Peter Posa, 77, New Zealand pop guitarist
 5 – Eddy Giles, 80, American R&B and blues singer-songwriter
 6 – Gerald English, 93, British opera singer
 9 
 Cadet, 28, British rapper
 Phil Western, 47, Canadian electronic synthesizer player and guitarist (Download, PlatEAU)
 11 
 Olli Lindholm, 54, Finnish rock singer and guitarist (Yö, Appendix)
 Harvey Scales, 78, American R&B and soul singer-songwriter
 13 – Willy Lambregt, 59, Belgian rock guitarist (The Scabs, Vaya Con Dios)
 15 – Kofi Burbridge, 57, American jam band keyboardist and flautist (Tedeschi Trucks Band, The Derek Trucks Band, Aquarium Rescue Unit)
 16
 Glenn Bell, 64, Canadian rock drummer (The Cooper Brothers)
 Ken Nordine, 98, American jazz spoken word artist
 17 – Ethel Ennis, 86, American jazz singer
 19 – Artie Wayne, 77, American pop singer, songwriter and producer
 20 
 Dominick Argento, 91, American classical music composer
 Gerard Koerts, 71, Dutch progressive rock keyboardist (Earth and Fire)
 21 
 Gus Backus, 81, American doo-wop singer (The Del-Vikings)
 Jackie Shane, 78, American soul singer
 Peter Tork, 77, American rock bassist and singer (The Monkees)
 23 – Dorothy Masuka, 83, Zimbabwean-born South African jazz singer-songwriter
 24 – Mac Wiseman, 93, American bluegrass singer and guitarist (Foggy Mountain Boys)
 25 – Mark Hollis, 64, British new wave and post-rock singer, songwriter and multi-instrumentalist (Talk Talk)
 26 – Andy Anderson, 68, British new wave drummer (The Cure, The Glove, Hawkwind)
 27 – Doug Sandom, 89, British rock drummer (The Who)
 28
 Stephan Ellis, 69, American rock bassist (Survivor)
 André Previn, 89, German-born American jazz and classical pianist, conductor and composer

March
 1 – Paul Williams, 78, British rock and blues singer (Zoot Money's Big Roll Band, Juicy Lucy, Tempest, Allan Holdsworth)
 2 – Al Hazan, 84, American pianist (B. Bumble and the Stingers), songwriter and record producer
 3 – Leo de Castro, 70, New Zealand funk and soul singer and guitarist
 4
 Keith Flint, 49, British electronica singer (The Prodigy)
 Sara Romweber, 55, American jangle pop drummer (Let's Active, Dex Romweber Duo)
 5 – Jacques Loussier, 84, French jazz pianist and film score composer (Jacques Loussier Trio)
 6
 James Dapogny, 78, American jazz pianist and musicologist
 Mike Grose, 77, British rock bassist (Queen)
 Charlie Panigoniak, 72, Canadian Inuk folk singer-songwriter
 8 – Eddie Taylor Jr., 46, American blues singer and guitarist
 10 – Asa Brebner, 65, American power pop singer, songwriter and guitarist (The Modern Lovers, Robin Lane & The Chartbusters)
 11 
 Hal Blaine, 90, American rock and pop drummer (The Wrecking Crew)
 Danny Kustow, 63, British punk rock guitarist (Tom Robinson Band)
 12 – John Kilzer, 62, American rock singer-songwriter
 16
 Dick Dale, 81, American surf rock guitarist
 David White, 79, American doo-wop and pop singer (Danny & the Juniors, The Spokesmen)
 17
 Wolfgang Meyer, 64, German classical clarinetist
 Bernie Tormé, 66, Irish guitarist (Gillan, Guy McCoy Tormé, Atomic Rooster, Desperado)
 Yuya Uchida, 79, Japanese rock musician (Flower Travellin' Band)
 Andre Williams, 82, American R&B singer
 20 – Terje Nilsen, 67, Norwegian pop singer-songwriter
 21 – Doris Duke, 77, American gospel and soul singer
 22 – Scott Walker, 76, American-born British pop and avant garde singer-songwriter (The Walker Brothers)
 23 – Shahnaz Rahmatullah, 66, Bangladeshi playback singer
 25 – Bill Isles, 78, American R&B singer (The O'Jays)
 26 – Ranking Roger, 56, British ska and new wave singer (The Beat, General Public)
 27
 Stephen Fitzpatrick, 24, British indie rock singer and guitarist (Her's)
 Audun Laading, 25, Norwegian indie rock bassist (Her's)
 30
 Geoff Harvey, 83, British-Australian television music composer and pianist
 Simaro Lutumba, 81, Congolese soukous guitarist (TPOK Jazz)
 31 – Nipsey Hussle, 33, American rapper

April
 1 – Armando Vega Gil, 64, Mexican rock bassist (Botellita de Jerez)
 2 
 Rick Elias, American contemporary Christian singer-songwriter and guitarist (A Ragamuffin Band)
 Kim English, 48, American house and gospel singer
 4 
 Alberto Cortez, 79, Argentine pop singer-songwriter
 Tiger Merritt, 31, American psychedelic rock singer and guitarist (Morning Teleportation)
 5 
 Pastor López, 74, Venezuelan cumbia singer-songwriter and bandleader
 Shawn Smith, 53, American alternative rock singer and keyboardist (Brad, Satchel, Pigeonhed)
 Davey Williams, 66, American avant-garde and free jazz guitarist (Curlew)
 Wowaka, 31, Japanese Vocaloid producer, singer and guitarist
 6 
 Jim Glaser, 81, American country singer
 Ib Glindemann, 84, Danish jazz bandleader and composer
 10 – Earl Thomas Conley, 77, American country singer-songwriter
 12 – Johnny Hutchinson, 78, British rock and roll drummer (The Big Three)
 13 – Paul Raymond, 73, British hard rock keyboardist (UFO, Savoy Brown, Chicken Shack)
 15 
 Les Reed, 83, British pop bandleader and songwriter
 Joe Terry, 78, American rock and roll singer (Danny & the Juniors)
 18 – Eddie Tigner, 92, American blues singer and keyboardist
 20 – Martin Böttcher, 91, German classical composer, arranger and conductor
 22
 Heather Harper, 88, Northern Irish classical singer
 Dave Samuels, 70, American jazz vibraphonist and marimba player (Spyro Gyra)
 23 – Earl Edwards, 82, American R&B singer and songwriter (The Dukays)
 24 – Dick Rivers, 74, French rock and roll singer (Les Chats Sauvages)
 26 – Phil McCormack, 58, American southern rock singer (Molly Hatchet)
 30 
 Boon Gould, 64, English new wave guitarist (Level 42)
 Beth Carvalho, 72, Brazilian samba singer

May
 2 – John Starling, 79, American bluegrass guitarist (The Seldom Scene)
 3 – Mose Se Sengo, 73, Congolese jazz guitarist (TPOK Jazz)
 4 – J. R. Cobb, 75, American rock guitarist and songwriter (Atlanta Rhythm Section, Classics IV)
 6 – Pekka Airaksinen, 73, Finnish electronic composer
 7 – Subir Nandi, 66, Bangladeshi playback singer
 8 
 Luther Jennings, 86, American gospel singer (Jackson Southernaires)
 Yevgeny Krylatov, 85, Russian film composer
 9
 Malcolm Black, 58, New Zealand new wave singer and guitarist (Netherworld Dancing Toys)
 Preston Epps, 88, American percussionist
 Freddie Starr, 76, English stand up comedian, impressionist and singer
 11 – Peggy Lipton, 72, American pop singer and actress
 13 – Doris Day, 97, American pop singer and actress
 14 
 Leon Rausch, 91, American country singer (Bob Wills and the Texas Playboys)
 Mike Wilhelm, 77, American psychedelic rock guitarist (The Charlatans, Flamin' Groovies)
 15
 Chuck Barksdale, 84, American R&B singer (The Dells)
 Huelyn Duvall, 79, American rockabilly singer and guitarist
 16 – Sol Yaged, 93, American jazz clarinetist
 17 – Eric Moore, 67, American hard rock singer and bassist (The Godz)
 18 
 Melvin Edmonds, 65, American new jack swing singer (After 7)
 Geneviève Waïte, 71, South African pop singer
 19 – Alfred Janson, 82, Norwegian classical pianist and composer
 21 – Jake Black, 59, British acid jazz singer and songwriter (Alabama 3)
 28 
 Willie Ford, 68, American soul singer (The Dramatics)
 John Gary Williams, 73, American R&B singer (The Mad Lads)
 29
 Tony Glover, 79, American blues singer and harmonica player (Koerner, Ray & Glover)
 Jeff Walls, 62, American jangle pop guitarist (Guadalcanal Diary)
 30 – Leon Redbone, 69, Cypriot-American jazz and ragtime singer and guitarist
 31 – Roky Erickson, 71, American psychedelic rock singer-songwriter (The 13th Floor Elevators)

June
 2 – Paulo Pagni, 61, Brazilian rock drummer (RPM)
 4 – Mikey Dees, American punk rock singer and guitarist (Fitz of Depression)
 5 – Brian Doherty, 51, American alternative rock guitarist (Big Wreck)
 6 – Dr. John, 77, American R&B and jazz singer-songwriter and keyboardist
 8 – Andre Matos, 47, Brazilian heavy metal singer (Viper, Angra, Shaman)
 9 
 Bushwick Bill, 52, Jamaican-born American rapper (Geto Boys)
 Jim Pike, 82, American pop singer (The Lettermen)
 10 
 Chuck Glaser, 83, American country singer (Tompall & the Glaser Brothers)
 Paul "Lil' Buck" Sinegal, 75, American blues and zydeco guitarist
 13 - Nature Ganganbaigal, 29, Chinese folk metal guitarist and multi-instrumentalist (Tengger Cavalry)
 16 
 Bishop Bullwinkle, 70, American soul and novelty singer
 Sergey Ostroumov, 53, Russian blues rock drummer (Mashina Vremeni)
 19 – Philippe Zdar, 52, French house musician and producer (Cassius)
 21 – Kelly Jay Fordham, 77, Canadian rock singer-songwriter and keyboardist (Crowbar)
 23 – Dave Bartholomew, 100, American R&B and rock and roll trumpeter, composer and bandleader
 24 – Jeff Austin, 45, American bluegrass singer and mandolinist (Yonder Mountain String Band)
 27 
 Gualberto Castro, 84, Mexican pop singer (Los Hermanos Castro)
 Louis Thiry, 84, French classical organist
 29 – Gary Duncan, 72, American psychedelic rock guitarist (Quicksilver Messenger Service)

July
 1
 Sid Ramin, 100, American composer and arranger
 Bogusław Schaeffer, 90, Polish classical composer
 2
 Ibrahim Emin, 56, Azerbaijani heavy metal bassist (Yukhu)
 Dante Rossi, 77, American garage rock guitarist and singer (The Baskerville Hounds)
 6 
 João Gilberto, 88, Brazilian bossa nova singer and guitarist
 Thommy Gustafsson, 71, Swedish pop keyboardist (Sven-Ingvars)
 Yannis Spathas, 68, Greek hard rock guitarist (Socrates Drank the Conium)
 9 – Aaron Rosand, 92, American classical violinist
 10 – Jerry Lawson, 75, American a cappella singer (The Persuasions)
 12
 Dick Richards, 95, American rock and roll drummer (Bill Haley & His Comets)
 Russell Smith, 70, American country rock singer (Amazing Rhythm Aces, Run C&W)
 16 
 Johnny Clegg, 66, South African afro-pop singer and guitarist (Juluka, Savuka)
 Pat Kelly, 70, Jamaican reggae singer
 Bill Vitt, American rock drummer (Jerry Garcia, Merl Saunders)
 18 – Bob Frank, 75, American folk singer-songwriter
 19 – Yao Lee, 96, Chinese pop singer
 21 – Ben Johnston, 93, American microtonal composer
 22 
 Daniel Rae Costello, 58, Fijian folk guitarist
 Art Neville, 81, American funk and R&B keyboardist (The Meters, The Neville Brothers)
 25 – Anner Bylsma, 85, Dutch classical cellist
 26 – Cacik Jonne, 54, Brazilian axé guitarist and composer (Chiclete com Banana)
 29 – Ras G, 39, American instrumental hip-hop producer
 30 – Lol Mason, 69, English progressive rock singer (City Boy, The Maisonettes)
 31 - Nigel Benjamin, 64, British rock singer (Mott, London)

August
 1 
 Ian Gibbons, 67, British rock keyboardist (The Kinks)
 Hamid Ali Khan, 66, Pakistani classical singer
 3 
 Damien Lovelock, 65, Australian rock singer (The Celibate Rifles)
 Katreese Barnes, 56, American R&B singer-songwriter (Juicy)
 4 – Bob Wilber, 91, American jazz clarinetist
 5 – Lizzie Grey, 60, American glam metal guitarist (Spiders & Snakes, London)
 6 – Danny Doyle, 79, Irish folk singer
 7 
 David Berman, 52, American indie rock singer-songwriter (Silver Jews, Purple Mountains)
 Francesca Sundsten, 58, American post-punk bassist (The Beakers)
 Nicky Wonder, 59, American power pop guitarist (Wondermints, Brian Wilson)
 11 – Jim Cullum Jr., 77, American jazz cornetist
 12 – DJ Arafat, 33, Ivorian Coupé-Décalé singer and disk jockey
 19 – Larry Taylor, 77, American bass guitarist (Canned Heat)
 21 – Celso Piña, 66, Mexican cumbia singer and accordionist
 26 – Neal Casal, 50, American rock guitarist (Chris Robinson Brotherhood, Ryan Adams & the Cardinals, Blackfoot)
 27 – Donnie Fritts, 76, American country keyboardist and songwriter
 28 – Nancy Holloway, 86, American jazz and pop singer
 29 – Jimmy Pitman, 72, American rock singer, songwriter and guitarist (Strawberry Alarm Clock)

September
 2 – Laurent Sinclar, 58, French new wave keyboardist (Taxi Girl)
 4 – Dan Warner, 49, American Latin pop guitarist
 5 – Jimmy Johnson, 76, American rock and soul guitarist (Muscle Shoals Rhythm Section)
 7 – Camilo Sesto, 72, Spanish pop singer
 9 
 Gru, 46, Serbian rapper
 Lavrentis Machairitsas, 62, Greek rock singer and guitarist
 10 
 Jeff Fenholt, 68, American rock and Christian contemporary singer (Bible Black, Geezer Butler Band)
 Daniel Johnston, 58, American lo-fi folk singer-songwriter
 Hossam Ramzy, 65, Egyptian-born jazz rock percussionist
 13 – Eddie Money, 70, American pop rock singer
 15 
 Roberto Leal, 67, Portuguese-Brazilian pop singer
 Ric Ocasek, 75, American new wave singer-songwriter and guitarist (The Cars)
 Mick Schauer, 46, American stoner rock keyboardist (Clutch)
 16
 John Cohen, 87, American folk banjoist and guitarist (New Lost City Ramblers)
 Vic Vogel, 84, Canadian jazz pianist
 17 – Alexandr Vasilyev, Russian new wave drummer (Center)
 18 – Tony Mills, 57, British hard rock singer (Shy, TNT)
 19 
 Sandie Jones, 68, Irish pop singer
 Harold Mabern, 83, American jazz pianist
 María Rivas, 59, Venezuelan Latin jazz singer
 Yonrico Scott, 63, American rock and blues drummer (The Derek Trucks Band)
 Larry Wallis, 70, British rock guitarist (Pink Fairies, Motörhead)
 21
 Margie Clarke, 74, American R&B singer (The Jewels)
 Woo Hye-mi, 31, South Korean pop singer
 23
 Richard Brunelle, 55, American heavy metal guitarist (Morbid Angel, Paths of Possession)
 Robert Hunter, 78, American rock lyricist and multi-instrumentalist (Grateful Dead)
 26 
 Jim Johnson, 76, American rock guitarist and singer (Gypsy)
 Jimmy Spicer, 61, American rapper
 Martin Wesley-Smith, 74, Australian classical composer
 28 
 Dessie O'Halloran, 79, Irish folk fiddler and singer
 José José, 71, Mexican Latin pop singer
 29 
 busbee, 43, American country and pop songwriter and producer
 Larry Willis, 78, American jazz pianist (Blood, Sweat & Tears)
 30 
 Jessye Norman, 74, American opera singer
 Louie Rankin, 61, Jamaican-born Canadian dancehall singer

October
 1
 Karel Gott, 80, Czech pop singer
 Beverly Watkins, 80, American blues guitarist
 2 
 Barrie Masters, 63, British pub rock singer (Eddie and the Hot Rods)
 Kim Shattuck, 56, American alternative rock singer and guitarist (The Muffs, The Pandoras, Pixies)
 Morten Stützer, Danish thrash metal guitarist (Artillery)
 3
 Vinnie Bell, 87, American session guitarist
 Mike Clough, 77, American folk singer and guitarist (The Back Porch Majority)
 4
 Ed Ackerson, 54, American alternative rock singer and guitarist (Polara, Antenna)
 Glen Brown, 75, Jamaican reggae singer
 5 – Larry Junstrom, 70, American Southern rock bassist (.38 Special, Lynyrd Skynyrd)
 6 
 Ginger Baker, 80, British rock and jazz drummer (Cream, Blind Faith, Ginger Baker's Air Force, The Graham Bond Organisation)
 8 – Molly Duncan, 74, British funk saxophonist (Average White Band)
 11 – Kadri Gopalnath, 69, Indian classical and jazz saxophonist
 12 
 George Chambers, 88, American psychedelic soul bassist and singer (The Chambers Brothers)
 Kenny Dixon, 27, American country drummer (Kane Brown)
 Dallas Harms, 82, Canadian country singer
 Gerry McGee, 81, American surf rock guitarist (The Ventures)
 13 – Steve Cash, 73, American Southern rock singer (Ozark Mountain Daredevils)
 14 – Sulli, 25, Korean pop singer (f(x))
 15 – Cacho Castaña, 77, Argentine bolero singer and actor
 17 – Ray Santos, 90, American Latin pop saxophonist
 21 – Peter Hobbs, 58, Australian thrash metal guitarist and singer (Hobbs' Angel of Death)
 22
 Don Baskin, 73, American garage rock singer and guitarist (Syndicate of Sound)
 Raymond Leppard, 92, British classical conductor and harpsichordist
 Hans Zender, 82, German classical conductor
 25 – Joe Sun, 76, American country singer
 26 – Paul Barrere, 71, American Southern rock guitarist (Little Feat)
 31 – Kendra Malia, 37, American witch house singer (White Ring)

November
 2 – Marie Laforêt, 80, French-Swiss pop singer
 4
 Timi Hansen, 67, Danish metal bassist (Mercyful Fate, King Diamond)
 Jerry Hudson, 70, American rock singer (The Road)
 5 – Jan Erik Kongshaug, 75, Norwegian jazz guitarist
 7 
 Ivan Maksimović, 57, Serbian hard rock guitarist (Metro, The No Smoking Orchestra)
 Gilles Bertin, 58, French punk rock singer and bassist (Camera Silens)
 8 
 Fred Bongusto, 84, Italian pop singer
 Ramakant Gundecha, Indian dhrupad singer (Gundecha Brothers)
 9 – Taiwo Lijadu, 71, Nigerian Afrobeat singer (Lijadu Sisters)
 10 – Jan Byrczek, 83, Polish jazz bassist
 11 – Bad Azz, 43, American rapper
 16 – Éric Morena, 68, French pop singer
 19 
 José Mário Branco, 77, Portuguese folk singer-songwriter
 Lloyd Watson, 70, British rock guitarist
 20 
 Doug Lubahn, 71, American psychedelic rock and jazz bassist (Clear Light, The Doors)
 John Mann, 57, Canadian folk rock singer-songwriter and guitarist (Spirit of the West)
 21
 Donna Carson, 73, American folk singer (Hedge and Donna)
 Farris Lanier Jr., 70, American R&B-soul-funk singer (Lanier & Co.)
 22 – Eduardo Nascimento, 76, Angolan pop singer
 24
 Goo Hara, 28, South Korean K-pop singer (Kara)
 Mary Nance, 72, American pop singer (The Sunshine Company)
 25 – Iain Sutherland, 71, British folk singer and guitarist (The Sutherland Brothers)
 27 – Martin Armiger, 70, Australian new wave singer and guitarist (The Sports)
 28 – Padú del Caribe, 99, Aruban waltz songwriter
 29 – Irving Burgie, 95, American calypso songwriter
 30 – Howard "Sparky" Childress, 76, American rock and roll guitarist (The Sparkletones)

December
 1 – Stuart Fraser, Australian hard rock guitarist (Noiseworks)
 2 
 Jimmy Cavallo, 92, American rock and roll singer
 Greedy Smith, 63, Australian new wave singer and keyboardist (Mental as Anything)
 3 – Shaaban Abdel Rahim, 62, Egyptian sha'abi singer
 4 – Rosa Morena, 78, Spanish flamenco pop singer
 5 – Jerry Naylor, 80, American rock and roll musician (The Crickets)
 7
 Herb Cox, 81, American doo-wop singer and songwriter (The Cleftones)
 Herbert Joos, 79, German jazz trumpeter and flugelhornist
 Joe McQueen, 100, American jazz saxophonist
 8 – Juice Wrld, 21, American rapper
 9 – Marie Fredriksson, 61, Swedish pop rock singer (Roxette)
 10 – Gershon Kingsley, 97, German-born American electronic composer and synthesizer player
 12 – Jack Scott, 83, Canadian rock and roll singer
 13 
 Roy Loney, 73, American garage rock singer and guitarist (Flamin' Groovies)
 Emil Richards, 87, American classical and jazz vibraphonist
 14 – Irv Williams, 100, American jazz saxophonist
 15 - Monique Leyrac, 91, Canadian pop singer
 18
 Patxi Andión, 72, Spanish pop singer-songwriter
 Alain Barrière, 84, French chanson singer
 Kenny Lynch, 81, British pop singer
 Arty McGlynn, 75, Irish folk guitarist (Patrick Street)
 Abbey Simon, 99, American classical pianist
 22 – Ubirajara Penacho dos Reis, 85, Brazilian jazz bassist
 24 
 Dave Riley, 59, American punk rock bassist (Big Black)
 Allee Willis, 72, American pop and funk songwriter
 25 
 Kelly Fraser, 26, Canadian pop singer-songwriter
 Peter Schreier, 84, German opera tenor and conductor
 26 – Sleepy LaBeef, 84, American rockabilly singer and guitarist
 27
 Don Imus, 79, American recording artist
 Garrett List, 76, American jazz trombonist and singer
 Jack Sheldon, 75, American jazz and children's music singer and trumpeter
 Art Sullivan, 69, Belgian pop singer
 28 
 Amy Patterson, 107, Argentine classical singer and composer
 Erzsébet Szőnyi, 95, Hungarian classical and opera composer
 29 
 Neil Innes, 75, British comedy rock singer-songwriter and guitarist (Bonzo Dog Doo-Dah Band, The Rutles, Monty Python)
 Norma Tanega, 80, American folk singer-songwriter

See also 

 Timeline of musical events
 Women in music

References

 
2019-related lists
Music by year
Culture-related timelines by year